Gonoglasa is a genus of moths of the family Erebidae. The genus was erected by George Hampson in 1924.

Species
Gonoglasa camptogramma Hampson, 1924 Thailand, Sumatra, Borneo
Gonoglasa contigua (Wileman, 1915) Formosa
Gonoglasa nigripalpis (Walker, [1863]) Thailand, Sumatra, Borneo
Gonoglasa sinuilinea Hampson, 1926 Sri Lanka

References

Calpinae